The Roe A. and Louise R. Deal House is an historic house in Springville, Utah, United States. The house was added to the U.S. National Register of Historic Places in 1998. Along with eleven other properties, the Deal House was nominated to the National Register via the Springville Multiple Property Submission.

The NRHP nomination for the house argues that it "is significant in the broad patterns of Springville history
as an example of the larger, more substantially constructed homes built during the late nineteenth and
early twentieth centuries", and that it demonstrates the development in Springville of awareness of popular architectural styles elsewhere.

References

Houses completed in 1900
Houses in Utah County, Utah
Houses on the National Register of Historic Places in Utah
National Register of Historic Places in Utah County, Utah
Buildings and structures in Springville, Utah
Individually listed contributing properties to historic districts on the National Register in Utah